The Yingkarta people, also written Inggarda and Ingarda, are an Aboriginal Australian people of the Gascoyne region of Western Australia.

Language

Yinggarda was a Kartu language spoken from the coastal area around Carnarvon through the Gascoyne River to the junction and southwards to the Wooramel River. The earliest record of the languages dates back from material collected by and anonymous source and forwarded by Lord Gifford to Edward Curr who published a list of basic words in 1886.

There were two dialects, a northern and southern variety, with marked lexical differences. Down to the end of the 20th century, it was reported that the Carnavon community had a wide knowledge of Yingkarta words, but that their use was somewhat restricted. Given the movement of Wadjarri into this area, a people with whom the Yiongkarta maintained strong links, the young mix the two vocabularies.

Country
The Yingkarta's lands, lying between the Gascoyne and River Wooramel rivers in a wedge of land separating those of the Tedei to their south, and of their northern neighbours the Mandi. Their inland extension, from the northern area of Shark Bay, ran as far east as the vicinity of Red Hill and Gascoyne Junction. Alan Dench also lists among their northern neighbours the Baiyungu, Maia, Tharrkari and Warriyangga, while stating the Malgana lay to their south, and the Wadjarri to their east.

History of contact
White colonial occupation of Yingkarta lands began in 1877 when the indigenous population was estimated to number some 2,000 people. Small-pox (moonnangno)was common among them.

Social organisation and rites
It is not known whether or not the Yinggarda had a section system. A. R. Radcliffe-Brown, writing in 1930, stated of them that:
In the case of the Ingarda tribe to the south of the Gascoyne River it was impossible to determine if they really had or had not a section system. They knew the names of the sections of the Maia and Warienga [Warriyangka] tribes and every man claimed membership of a particular section. ... They might once have had such a system which had broken down or they might merely be trying to adapt themselves as well as possible to the social organisation of the neighbouring tribes. When the data was collected in 1911, little was remembered of their marriage systems and Alan Dench thinks it probable, unlike many neighbouring tribes to their north, they did not have a moieties.

The Yingkarta were said by some early explorers to have practiced circumcision. However, they lie to the west of the circumcision line, was denied by a colonial observer in 1886 who was familiar with their language, and has been contested by modern descendants and scholars, who state that this was a practice of the Watjarri to their west. Since the Inggarda social bands contiguous with the Watjarri were known under the distinct hordal name of Kurudandi (perhaps surviving in the contemporary station toponym Coordewandy, Tindale suggested that while the Inggarda to the east had not adopted this rite, the western clans might have at some time taken up the practice as current among the Watjarri.

The Nanda on the southern end of Shark Bay were much in fear of the Inggarda whom they regarded as highly proficient in the art of sorcery (boollia), which included the power to conjure up rain at will.

Alternative names
 Angaardi, Angaardie
 Ingara, Ingarra, Ingarrah, Ingra
 Ingarda, Inggadi, Ingada, Ingadi
 Inparra. (perhaps a misprint)
 Jaburu ("northerners")
 Kakarakala. (a Mandi exonym referring also to the Baiyungu and Maia, from kalarra and karla(fire) the root of this word, kakarra means "east", a generic term.
 Kurudandi (eastern hordes)

Some words
 mama (father).
 narana (white man).
 papa/kunta (water).
 pipi (mother)
  thuthu (dog)

Notes

Citations

Sources

Aboriginal peoples of Western Australia
Gascoyne